BlackBerry Torch is a series of smartphones manufactured by BlackBerry Ltd. The lineup consists of the following:
 BlackBerry Torch 9800, the first phone in the series, powered by BlackBerry OS 6.
 BlackBerry Torch 9810, which physically mimics the 9800, but with improved internal hardware and BlackBerry OS 7.
 BlackBerry Torch 9850/9860, featuring a larger touch screen, no keyboard, and BlackBerry OS 7.

On August 12, 2011, the updated Torch 9810 was released on Bell Mobility and Telus Mobility. The updated version includes a faster processor, and more memory, as well as including the new BlackBerry OS 7.

BlackBerry Torch 9800

The BlackBerry Torch 9800 is a 2010 model in the BlackBerry line of smartphones. It combines a physical QWERTY keyboard with a sliding multi-touch screen display and runs on BlackBerry OS 6.  Introduced on August 3, 2010, the phone became available exclusively on AT&T on August 12, 2010.

The device looks similar to existing BlackBerry devices, but due to the sliding keyboard features a bigger 3.2 inch 480x360 screen (the same resolution as the BlackBerry Storm and BlackBerry Storm 2) and these features allow the BlackBerry Torch 9800 to look unique. The software is seen by most to be an improvement over the previous version.

History
Speculation of the Torch began in April 2010 when RIM CEO Mike Lazaridis introduced the BlackBerry 6 operating system during his keynote address at WES 2010. A new touchscreen device was widely anticipated as the OS 6 update seemed to be touch/gesture based. Images of a BlackBerry device prototype with a touchscreen and slide-out QWERTY keyboard started emerging in late spring and early summer of 2010. The device was tentatively named the "Bold 9800" or simply the "9800 Slider". The 9800 eventually was officially named the "Torch" by RIM during its August announcement. It can be assumed that the device name was derived from Torch Mobile, the company that RIM purchased in 2009 in aid with their development of a WebKit based browser.

Reception
The BlackBerry Torch 9800 was marketed as "the best BlackBerry ever". However, upon release of the device's technical details, critics, such as PC World's Ginny Mies, were not impressed with the specifications which lagged behind new-generation devices such as the iPhone 4 and Droid X. One reviewer did not find enough difference over earlier BlackBerrys to recommend the device to new users. Key complaints were the 624 MHz processor included in the Torch, whereas the HTC Evo 4G and Motorola Droid X (among others of their class) featured a 1 GHz processor. The Torch's 3.2 inch screen with 480x360 screen resolution was also criticized as being smaller than iPhone 4's 3.5 inch screen with 960x640 resolution and the Motorola Droid X's 4.3 inch with 854 x 480. The Torch has a screen that is the same size as the Storm and Storm 2 with a resolution the same as the Bold 9700, Bold 9650 and Tour 9630. Some critics also noted the lack of HD video recording and the lack of a front-facing camera.

CNET's Bonnie Cha found improvements such as the better user interface, universal search and the much improved browser and multimedia experience. On the other hand, she also found that the smartphone can be sluggish, and could stand for some hardware upgrades, although her review was generally positive.

RIM has stated that the processor in the Torch is 'of a newer generation', when boot times of the Torch and the BlackBerry Bold 9700 (both running OS6) are compared the Torch boots up 1.8 times faster than the Bold with the "older processor".

UBM techinsite has confirmed the claims of Research in Motion, by performing a "tear down" and making a hardware analysis, discovering a PXA940 Processor. This processor is built on 45nm as opposed to the Processor found in the Blackberry Bold 1 and 2. The 45 nm process keeps heat production and power usage down, and the processor as previously stated in this article brings significant performance gains.

Anandtech praised the screen of the phone as being: "one of the most readable outside that I've encountered in a while, with text and webpages being easy to make out even in intense daylight. Alongside the iPhone 4, the difference is pretty immediate, especially in how good white appears on the Torch compared to the iPhone4. Anandtech also noted that the contrast ratio was exceptionally good.

Crackberry's Kevin Michaluk gave the BlackBerry Torch an overwhelmingly positive review stating that the Torch is a "worthy device for any smartphone owner". Crackberry praised OS 6.0, the form factor, touchscreen, and the WebKit browser. However, Michaluk criticized the lack of HD video recording and lack of OpenGL support for 3D graphics.

Sales
Initial sales of the BlackBerry Torch were slow to moderate, with AT&T Wireless Operations president expressing some disappointment in the sales stating that he was "surprised there hasn't been a faster adoption" of the smart phone by the public. Estimates put sales at somewhere between 100,000 and 150,000 devices sold during the first week of release. However, sales reportedly improved in the months following the release and RIM shipped a record amount of smart phones in the final quarter of 2010. The BlackBerry Torch placed 6th place on Wirefly's annual top ten selling smart phones list for 2010, selling more than Motorola's Droid 2 and Samsung's Galaxy S Fascinate, but behind devices like the Evo 4G and Droid Incredible.

OS 7 series

BlackBerry Torch 9810
This BlackBerry was released by Research in Motion, as the successor to the original BlackBerry Torch 9800.  The touchscreen display, keyboard, camera, battery, microSD slot and overall design of the phone remain unchanged from the 9800, as is the cellular, Bluetooth, and Wi-Fi connectivity support.

Changes to the 9810 compared to the 9800 mostly concern the internal components or the software.  For example, the 9810 includes a 1.2 GHz processor chip which is almost twice as fast as the 9800's 624 MHz processor. 9810 improves upon its predecessor, 9800, with the same  3.2" inch touch screen but with a VGA (640×480) resolution at 246 DPI. RAM has also been upgraded from 512 MB to 768 MB, while the internal flash storage increased from 4 GB to 8 GB.  The only hardware change seems to be the magnetometer and some color variants. it resembles the 9800. It has a battery capacity of 1270Ah.

BlackBerry OS 7 is included with the BlackBerry Torch 9810.  This OS supports OpenGL ES and other APIs for additional features. For example, the device has an enhanced GPS navigation system installed. A 4G version was available with select carriers eventually.

BlackBerry Torch 9850/9860
The BlackBerry Torch 9860 is a full touchscreen smartphone developed by Research In Motion (RIM) also announced on August 3, 2011. As the natural progression of the Torch and Storm lines the 9850/60 dispenses with the slideout keyboard and the surepress screen made famous with its predecessors and focuses on an all touch interface unique within the BlackBerry line. It also offered the largest screen of any BlackBerry until the arrival of the BlackBerry Z10.

In many ways the 9850/60 is very similar to its sister model the 9810 including chipset, battery power, browser capability and liquid graphics technology. It also maintains as do all current Blackberry models the standard four button (answer, menu, back, end) and TrackPad line of buttons on the bottom front of the phone. Unlike the Bold 9900/30 and Curve 9380 models however it does not offer Near Field Communication technology.

In Canada, the Torch 9860 was available at Bell Mobility, Rogers Wireless, Sasktel, Telus Mobility, and Videotron.  Bell, Rogers and Telus have since discontinued it.

In India, the Torch 9860 is available at Mobile Store, BlackBerry exclusive showroom, and many retail stores dealing in mobile.

Model comparison

BlackBerry Torch 9800
 Size:
 111mm × 62mm × 14.6mm (closed)
 148mm × 62mm × 14.6mm (open)
 Weight: 5.68 ounces (161.1 grams)
 Processor: Marvell PXA940 running at 624 MHz
 Image System Processor (ISP): STmicroelectronics STV0987
 Display: 3.2 inch HVGA+(480x360) Synaptics controlled touch screen
 Camera: 5.0 MP camera (JPEG encoding) with flash, 2x digital zoom, image stabilization and auto-focus
 Video recorder: up to 480p resolution
 Battery: 1300 mAhr removable/rechargeable lithium-ion cell
 Battery life: 18 days (GSM) or 14 days (UMTS) standby; 5.5 hours (GSM) or 5.8 hours (UMTS) talk
 GPS using A-GPS with extended ephemeris and maps
 Input: trackpad, touch screen with on-screen keyboard (QWERTY and SureType), slide-out backlit QWERTY keyboard
 Video format support: MPEG4, H.263, H.264, WMV3
 Audio format support: MP3, AMR-NB, AAC-LC, AAC+, eAAC+, WMA, WMV, FLAC, Ogg Vorbis
 Ringtones: MIDI, MP3
 Connectivity: 3G; Bluetooth 2.1 + EDR; 802.11 b/g/n Wi-Fi; 3.5mm stereo headset, Micro-USB
 Networks:
 Tri-band 3G UMTS/HSDPA networks: 2100/1900/850/800 MHz
 Quad-band GSM/GPRS/EDGE networks: 850/900/1800/1900 MHz

OS 7 series

References

External links 

 BlackBerry Worldwide - New BlackBerry 9850 and 9860 Torch Touch Screen Phone

Haptic technology
Personal digital assistants
Information appliances
Torch
Mobile phones with an integrated hardware keyboard
Touchscreen portable media players
Mobile phones introduced in 2010

fr:BlackBerry Torch 9800
ja:BlackBerry Torch 9800